Walter Schwimmer (born 16 June 1942, Vienna) is a former politician and diplomat from Austria. Was Secretary General of the Council of Europe from September 1, 1999, to August 31, 2004.

Life
After being a member of the Austrian Parliament (National Council) for 28 years, serving as chairperson of several committees (Justice, Health, Housing and Construction) and deputy leader of his political group (ÖVP – Austrian People's Party), he was elected Secretary General of the Council of Europe.

Schwimmer held this post from September 1, 1999, until September 1, 2004.  At the beginning of his term, The Economist accused him of being a "timid moral policeman" over his treatment of the Chechen–Russian conflict.
In June 2004 his attempt to be elected to a second five-year term as secretary general failed, like all his predecessors of whom no one was reelected.

Schwimmer currently works as a consultant on international relations and European affairs, based in Klosterneuburg near Vienna.

Schwimmer is (honorary) Secretary General of the Maison de la Méditerranée/Fondazione Mediterraneo (Naples) and Chairman of the International Coordination Committee of the World Public Forum - Dialogue of Civilisations.

On April 15, 2010, he became president of Megatrend University, the largest private university in Serbia. He resigned from this position in January 2013.

Political views

In a 2015 with Russia Direct he emphasized that the Euromaidan "was originally a civil society movement against corruption and had nothing to do with pro-European or anti-Russian choice. However, it was seen by Russia as a coup d'état and by the EU as a kind of strategic decision of Ukraine to go not with Russia but with Europe, which Schwimmer dismissed as a "misinterpretation" and "nonsense." In the same interview he blames poor European communication for the Russian military getting "concerned about the possibility of losing the naval base in Sevastopol." Not giving Russia a guarantee to keep the naval base in Sevastopol was a mistake, according to Schwimmer: "now Russia and the EU are trapped. Russia will not retreat from Crimea and the EU cannot acknowledge its annexation, since it was against international law. And now Russia and the EU are trapped in this escalation of sanctions that are leading to nothing."

Honours and awards

National honours 
 : Grand Decoration of Honour in Gold with Sash for Services to the Republic of Austria (2005)

Foreign honours 
 : Chevalier of the French Legion of Honour
 : Order of the Aztec Eagle (Águila Azteca)
 : Grand Cross of the Order of the Star of Romania

Bibliography
 "The European Dream", Continuum Publishing, London 2004 (translated from the German "Der Traum Europa, Springer-Verlag 2003, also available in Russian, Italian and Serbian).

External links
 Maison de la Méditerranée/Fondazione Mediterraneo
 World Public Forum Dialogue of Civilizations
 World Public Forum Dialogue of Civilizations/Vienna headquarters
 European Democracy Forum
 Austrian Parliament

References

Council of Europe Secretaries-General
1942 births
Living people

Grand Crosses of the Order of the Star of Romania
Recipients of the Grand Decoration with Sash for Services to the Republic of Austria
Chevaliers of the Légion d'honneur